Russell Morris Carneal (May 9, 1918 – July 27, 1998) was an American legislator and judge who served in the Virginia House of Delegates from 1954 to 1973. After his retirement from the lower house of the state legislature, Carneal assumed the district court judgeship of York County. In 1977, he was appointed to the Ninth Circuit of the Virginia Circuit Court and retired in 1989. Carneal attended the University of Virginia and served in the United States Navy during World War II. He died in 1998.

References

External links

1918 births
1998 deaths
20th-century American judges
United States Navy personnel of World War II
Members of the Virginia House of Delegates
Politicians from Fredericksburg, Virginia
United States Navy sailors
University of Virginia alumni
University of Virginia School of Law alumni
Virginia circuit court judges

20th-century American politicians